Curt VanderWall (born November 3, 1961) is an American politician who has served in the Michigan Senate from the 35th district since 2019. He previously served in the Michigan House of Representatives from the 101st district from 2017 to 2018.

References

External links 
 Curt VanderWall at ballotpedia.org
 Senator Curt VanderWall

1961 births
Living people
Republican Party members of the Michigan House of Representatives
Republican Party Michigan state senators
Politicians from Grand Rapids, Michigan
21st-century American politicians